Oxacme commota is a moth in the subfamily Arctiinae. It was described by Rudolf van Eecke in 1927. It is found on Sumatra in Indonesia.

References

Moths described in 1927
Cisthenina